Paradiopa postfusca is a moth of the family Noctuidae first described by George Hampson in 1893. It is found in Sri Lanka and India.

Its forewings are rich brown with lesser white fasciation. Hindwing without a subbasal pale grey patch.

References

Moths of Asia
Moths described in 1893
Hadeninae